Esma'il Mass'oud (or Esma'il Mirza Mo'tamed ed-Dowleh) (1887–1968) was a Persian Prince of Qajar dynasty, son of Mass'oud Mirza Zell-e Soltan and grandson of Nasser al-Din Shah Qajar.

He was educated in École spéciale militaire de Saint-Cyr in Paris and Royal Military Academy Sandhurst in London. Esma'il Mirza was appointed by George VI a Knight Commander of Order of the Star of India and a Knight of the Order of the White Eagle in Russia by Tsar Nicholas II. He returned to Iran in 1916 and died at age of 81 in 1968 in Esfahan.

He was buried in Takht-e Pulad cemetery.

Offspring

 Puran Dokh (1922–1993; married Mostafa Soltani, had two children: Bahram Soltani and Shala Soltani (b. 1942))
 Assefeh (1923–1993; married Morteza Soltani, had four children: Homa, Hayedeh, Bahman and Mitra Soltani)

Honors

 Knight Commander of Order of the Star of India
 Grand Cross of Légion d'honneur of France
 Knight of the Order of the White Eagle of Russia

References
 Soltani, Shahla (2006). Aqajan Shazdeh. Tehran: Farzan Rooz. 

Qajar princes
1887 births
1968 deaths
Recipients of the Order of the White Eagle (Russia)
Grand Croix of the Légion d'honneur